Moolawatana Station mostly referred to as Moolawatana is a pastoral lease operating as a cattle station in South Australia.

Moolawatana stretches from east to west, unusual in South Australia, as its northern boundary abuts the Dog-proof fence. It straddles the north eastern tip of the Flinders Ranges and its outwash plains. The ephemeral Hamilton Creek runs through the property.

History
The property was originally taken up by William Warwick in 1853 along with Holowiliena Station.

A fire at the station in 1896 destroyed between 120 and 130 bales of wool and the wagons it was being carted on, the cause of the fire was not known.
 
Heavy rains caused flooding along Hamilton Creek in 1903,  of rain feel at nearby Mount Freeling over the course of a few days.

Moolawatana was passed in at auction for £13,500 in 1935. The property was owned at the time by Neil McGilp and sons, who had acquired the leasehold in 1880. It was sold later the same year to Messrs A.J. and P.A. McBride of the Wilgena Pastoral Company for £15,000 along with the 6,700 sheep and 20 horses that the property was stocked with. The  station adjoined Wooltana Station.

The McBrides sold the property in 1947 to the Leslie Brothers of Mount Fitton Station, which adjoins Moolawatana to the west. The Leslies paid £22,500 to acquire Moolawatana.

The property switched from sheep to cattle in 1993 as a result of dog attacks on sheep, earlier the same year over 900 dogs had been shot, 98 of them inside the fence.

Moolawatana had good rains in 1997 causing the creek to run, a long dry spell followed with much of the surrounding area being drought struck. In 2001 the property experienced heavy thunderstorms followed by a locust outbreak with one swarm taking two hours to fly past the homestead. More good rains fell in 2008.

The land occupying the extent of the Moolawatana Station pastoral lease was gazetted as a locality by the Government of South Australia on 26 April 2013  under the name 'Moolawatana'.

Proposed wind and solar hub
In November 2021, Kallis Energy Investments announced a proposal to build a wind and solar farm near Moolawatana Station. The Moolawatana Renewable Hydrogen Project would use the electricity to produce green hydrogen and export it through a pipeline to Port Bonython on Spencer Gulf.

See also
List of ranches and stations

References

Pastoral leases in South Australia
Stations (Australian agriculture)
Flinders Ranges
1853 establishments in Australia
Far North (South Australia)